Events in the year 2005 in Mexico.

Incumbents

Federal government
 President: Vicente Fox 

 Interior Secretary (SEGOB): Santiago Creel
 Secretary of Foreign Affairs (SRE): Luis Ernesto Derbez
 Communications Secretary (SCT): Pedro Cerisola
 Education Secretary (SEP): Reyes Tamez
 Secretary of Defense (SEDENA): Gerardo Clemente Vega
 Secretary of Navy (SEMAR): Marco Antonio Peyrot González
 Secretary of Labor and Social Welfare (STPS)
José Carlos María Abascal Carranza (date of resignation not available)
Francisco Javier Salazar Sáenz (date of appointment not available)
 Secretary of Welfare (SEDESOL): Josefina Vázquez Mota
 Tourism Secretary (SECTUR): Rodolfo Elizondo Torres
 Secretary of the Environment (SEMARNAT)
Alberto Cárdenas Jiménez, until June 23
José Luis Luege Tamargo, starting June 23
 Secretary of Health (SALUD): Julio Frenk
Attorney General of Mexico (PRG)
Rafael Macedo de la Concha, until April 27
Daniel Cabeza de Vaca, starting April 28

Supreme Court

 President of the Supreme Court: Mariano Azuela Güitrón

Governors

 Aguascalientes: Luis Armando Reynoso 
 Baja California: Eugenio Elorduy Walther 
Baja California Sur
Leonel Cota Montaño , until April 5.
Narciso Agúndez Montaño , starting April 5.
 Campeche: Jorge Carlos Hurtado Valdez 
 Chiapas: Pablo Salazar Mendiguchía 
 Chihuahua: José Reyes Baeza Terrazas 
 Coahuila
Enrique Martínez y Martínez , until February 15
Humberto Moreira , starting February 17
 Colima: Gustavo Vázquez Montes 
 Durango: Ismael Hernández 
 Guanajuato: Juan Carlos Romero Hicks 
 Guerrero
René Juárez Cisneros , date not available
Zeferino Torreblanca , date not available
 Hidalgo
Manuel Ángel Núñez Soto , until March 31
Miguel Ángel Osorio Chong , starting April 1
 Jalisco: Alberto Cárdenas 
 State of Mexico
Arturo Montiel , until September 16
Enrique Peña Nieto , starting September 16
 Michoacán: Lázaro Cárdenas Batel 
 Morelos: Sergio Estrada Cajigal Ramírez 
 Nayarit
Antonio Echevarría Domínguez, until September
Ney González Sánchez, starting September
 Nuevo León: Fernando Canales Clariond 
 Oaxaca: Ulises Ruiz Ortiz 
 Puebla
Melquíades Morales , until January 31
Mario Plutarco Marín Torres , starting February 1
 Querétaro: Francisco Garrido Patrón 
 Quintana Roo
Joaquín Hendricks Díaz , until April 4
Félix González Canto , starting April 5
 San Luis Potosí: Jesús Marcelo de los Santos 
 Sinaloa: Juan S. Millán , until December 31
 Sonora: Eduardo Bours 
 Tabasco: Manuel Andrade Díaz , starting January 1
 Tamaulipas
Tomás Yarrington , until February 1
Eugenio Hernández Flores , starting February 5
 Tlaxcala: Alfonso Sánchez Anaya 
 Veracruz: Fidel Herrera Beltrán 
 Yucatán: Víctor Cervera Pacheco 
 Zacatecas: Amalia García 
Head of Government of the Federal District: Alejandro Encinas Rodríguez

Events

 CUMEX is formed. 
 The Socialist Alliance (Mexico) is formed.
 The Centro de Investigaciones Cientifícas de las Huastecas 'Aguazarca' is founded.
 January 30 – New Alliance Party founded. 
 March 3 – Víctor Trujillo (aka Brozo) presents videos showing proof of corruption by government officials of the Federal District, initiating the scandal labeled videoescándalos.
 March 23 – The Security and Prosperity Partnership of North America is signed by the leaders of Canada, Mexico and the United States in Waco, Texas.
 March 29 – Ariel Award in 2005 
 April 7 – The Chamber of Deputies votes to lift Andrés Manuel López Obrador's constitutional immunity against prosecution (desafuero).
 April 16–17 – National Assembly of the Socialist Left 
 May 8 – 2005 Denver police officer shooting 
 June 8: Alejandro Domínguez Coello is murdered. 
 July 18 – Hurricane Emily (category 4) hits the Yucatán Peninsula.
 September 2 – Nuestra Belleza México 2005 
 September 8 – The Mexican Army is received with honors at Kelly Air Force Base, Texas in response to Hurricane Katrina.
 October 4 – Hurricane Stan (category 1) hits the state of Veracruz.
 October 21 – Hurricane Wilma (category 4) hits the Yucatán Peninsula.
 November 4 – Start of the Mar del Plata Summit of the Americas.
 November 7 – radio program El Weso starts airing. 
 November 10 – Beginning of the 2005 Mexico and Venezuela diplomatic crisis.
 December 9 – the Mesoamerican Energy Integration Program was signed between by Mexico, Colombia, Dominican Republic and Central America.
 December 25 — The Popocateptl volcano's crater produced an explosion which ejected a large column of smoke and ash about  into the atmosphere and expulsion of lava.

Elections

 2005 Coahuila state election
 2005 Colima gubernatorial election
 2005 State of Mexico election

Awards

	
Belisario Domínguez Medal of Honor	- Gilberto Borja Navarrete
Order of the Aztec Eagle	
National Prize for Arts and Sciences	
National Public Administration Prize	
Ohtli Award
 Marylou Olivarez Mason
 Miguel D. Wise 
 Blanca Alvarado
 Ruben Barrales

Popular culture

Sports 

 Primera División de México Clausura 2005 
 Primera División de México Apertura 2005 
 2005 InterLiga 
 Fútbol Americano 
 2005 Mexican Figure Skating Championships 
 2005 Gran Premio Telmex/Tecate 
 2005 Desafío Corona season 
 2005 Rally México 
 2005 Caribbean Series in Mazatlán 
 Homenaje a Dos Leyendas (2005) 
 2005 IIHF World Championship Division III won by Mexico in Mexico.

Music

Film

 March 29 – The XLVII edition of the Ariel Award by the Mexican Academy of Film takes place at the Palacio de Bellas Artes in Mexico City
 November 4 – La mujer de mi hermano

Literature

TV

Telenovelas
 July 18 – Amor en custodia on TV Azteca
 July 18 – La esposa virgen on Televisa
 September 26 – El Amor No Tiene Precio on Televisa
 October 3 – Machos on TV Azteca

Notable deaths

 January 5 – Eduardo Hay (89), International Olympic Committee
 January 14 – Ofelia Guilmain (83), Spanish -born film and stage actress
January 18 – Teodoro Herrera Sosa, politician , former municipal president, Soto la Marina, Tamaulipas;murdered along with wife and two children.
 January 22 – Consuelo Velázquez (88), songwriter and lyricist, and author of the enduring song Bésame mucho
 February 24 – Gustavo Vázquez Montes (42), incumbent governor of Colima
 March 27 – Rigo Tovar (58), popular singer and composer
 April 10 – Raúl Gibb Guerrero (53), newspaper editor
 April 16 – Dolores Guadalupe García Escamilla (39), journalist
 April 16 – Jaime Fernández (67), actor
 April 29 – Mariana Levy (39), actress
 May 5 – Édgar Ponce (30), actor
 June 5 – Oscar Morelli (59), actor
 June 5 – Adolfo Aguilar Zínser (55), scholar, diplomat and politician
 June 8 – Alejandro Domínguez (52), chief of police of Nuevo Laredo, Tamaulipas
 July 2 – Martin Sanchez (26), boxer
 July 6 – Marga López (81), Argentine -born screen and television actress
 August 6 – Leonardo Rodríguez Alcaine (86), trade union leader
 September 21 – Ramón Martín Huerta (48), minister of public security of the federal government
 November 6 – Ignacio Burgoa Orihuela (87), lawyer and professor

References

External links